Events from the year 1779 in Sweden

Incumbents
 Monarch – Gustav III

Events

 Carl Wilhelm Scheele creates Glycerol.
 The first theater in Gothenburg, Comediehuset, is inaugurated.

Births

 26 July - Erik Gustaf Göthe, sculptor   (died 1838)
 20 August - Jöns Jacob Berzelius, chemist (died 1848)
 15 October - Johan Olof Wallin, orator, poet and archbishop (died 1839)
 Charlotta Aurora De Geer, salonist (died 1834)
 16 December – Vilhelmina Gyldenstolpe, court official (died 1858)
 Peter Westerstrøm, mass murderer  (died 1809)

Deaths

 16 November - Pehr Kalm, explorer (born 1716)
 Henrika Juliana von Liewen, salonist (born 1709)
 Jean François Beylon, courtier (born 1717)

References

 
Years of the 18th century in Sweden